Shahed 121 is an Iranian unmanned aerial vehicle (UAV), part of the drone family that includes the Shahed 125 and Shahed 129. Shahed translates in the Arabic and Persian languages to witness.

It was noticed in 2016 when it flew over the USS Harry S. Truman, a nuclear-power aircraft carrier, in international airspace. The US Navy regarded this as a security breach which had not happened since 2014. The incident occurred after a nuclear deal that Iran signed with world powers, including the US. A US Navy Seahawk helicopter filmed the incident.  The flight of Shahed 121 was considered by Iranian authorities to be safe as its wings were all "clean", implying that the drone did not carry weapons and was not dangerous to ships but the high command of the US Navy described it as "abnormal" and "unprofessional".

References 

 
149
Military equipment of Iran
Unmanned aerial vehicles of Iran
Aircraft manufactured in Iran
Iranian military aircraft